Tapaktuan is a town in the southwest of Aceh province. The town is the capital (seat of the government) of South Aceh Regency. According to the 2013 census, it has a population of 23,100.

Climate
Tapaktuan has a tropical rainforest climate (Af) with heavy to very heavy rainfall year-round.

Further reading

 See The Fourth Circle: A political ecology of Sumatra's rainforest frontier by John F McCarthy (Stanford University Press, 2006).

References

Populated places in Aceh
Regency seats of Aceh